The Diocese of the French Armed Forces is a Latin Church military ordinariate of the Catholic Church. Immediately subject to the Holy See, it provides pastoral care to Catholics serving in the French Armed Forces and their families.

History

The post of military bishop was created in 1949, and a military vicariate was established on 26 July 1952. It was elevated to a military ordinariate on 21 July 1986. The cathedra is located at the Church of Saint-Louis-des-Invalides (L'Église Saint-Louis-des-Invalides) in Paris, France.

Office holders

Military bishops
 Maurice Feltin (appointed 29 October 1949 – became military vicar 26 July 1952)

Military vicars
 Maurice Feltin (appointed 26 July 1952 – retired 15 April 1967)
 Jean-Marie-Clément Badré (appointed 15 May 1967 – translated to the Diocese of Bayeux-Lisieux 10 December 1969)
 Gabriel Vanel (appointed 21 April 1970 – resigned 12 February 1983)
 Jacques Louis Marie Joseph Fihey (appointed 12 February 1983 – became military ordinary 21 July 1986)

Military ordinaries
 Jacques Louis Marie Joseph Fihey (appointed 21 July 1986 – translated to the Diocese of Countances-Avranches 22 April 1989)
 Michel Marie Jacques Dubost, C.I.M. (appointed 9 August 1989 – translated to the Diocese of Évry–Corbeil-Essonnes 15 April 2000)
 Patrick Le Gal (appointed 23 May 2000 – appointed Auxiliary Bishop of Lyon 7 October 2009)
 Luc Marie Daniel Ravel, C.R.S.V. (appointed 7 October 2009 – translated to the Roman Catholic Archdiocese of Strasbourg, 18 February 2017)
 Antoine de Romanet (appointed 28 June 2017)

References

External links
 
  Centre national des Archives de l'Église de France, L’Épiscopat francais depuis 1919 , retrieved: 2016-12-24.
 Military Ordinariate of France (Catholic-Hierarchy) 
 Diocèse aux Armées Françaises (France) (GCatholic.org)

France
France
1952 establishments in France
Military of France